Retiolitidae is an extinct family of graptolites characterized by meshwork-like tubaria.

Genera
List of genera from Maletz (2014):

Subfamily Retiolitinae
†Dabashanograptus Ge, 1990
†Dimykterograptus Haberfelner, 1936
†Eiseligraptus Hundt, 1965
†Eorograptus Sennikov, 1984
†Gladiograptus Lapworth, 1875 in Hopkinson & Lapworth (1875)
†Gladiolites Barrande, 1850
†Pileograptus Lenz & Kozłowska, 2007
†Pseudoplegmatograptus Přibyl, 1948b
†Pseudoretiolites Bouček & Münch, 1944
†Retiolites Barrande, 1850
†Rotaretiolites Bates & Kirk, 1992
†Sinostomatograptus Huo, 1957
†Stomatograptus Tullberg, 1883
†Tscharyschograptus Sennikov, 1984

Subfamily Plectograptinae
†Agastograptus Obut & Zaslavskaya, 1983
†Baculograptus Lenz & Kozłowska-Dawidziuk, 2002
†Balticograptus Bouček & Münch, 1952
†Cometograptus Kozłowska-Dawidziuk, 2001
†Doliograptus Lenz & Kozłowska-Dawidziuk, 2002
†Eisenackograptus Kozłowska-Dawidziuk, 1990
†Giganteograptus Lenz & Kozłowska, 2007
†Gothograptus Frech, 1897
†Holoretiolites Eisenack, 1951
†Kirkigraptus Kozłowska & Bates, 2008
†Mirorgraptus Lenz & Kozłowska, 2007
†Neogothograptus Kozłowska-Dawidziuk, 1995
†Papiliograptus Lenz & Kozłowska, 2002
†Paraplectograptus Přibyl, 1948a
†Plectodinemagraptus Kozłowska-Dawidziuk, 1995
†Plectograptus Moberg & Törnquist, 1909
†Pseudoplectograptus Obut & Zaslavskaya, 1983
†Quattuorgraptus Dobrowolska, 2013
†Reticuloplectograptus Kozłowska, Bates & Piras, 2010
†Sagenograptoides Lenz & Kozłowska, 2010
†Sagenograptus Lenz & Kozłowska-Dawidziuk, 2001
†Semiplectograptus Kozłowska-Dawidziuk, 1995
†Sokolovograptus Obut & Zaslavskaya, 1976
†Spinograptus Bouček & Münch, 1952
†Valentinagraptus Piras, 2006

References

Graptolites
Prehistoric hemichordate families